Úrvalsdeild Women's Playoffs MVP is an Icelandic basketball award which is awarded annually to the player judged most valuable to his team during the Úrvalsdeild playoffs.

Winners 
The following is a list of the recent Úrvalsdeild Women's Playoffs MVP's.

References

External links
Icelandic Basketball Federation Official Website 
History of Úrvalsdeild kvenna playoffs: 1993-present 

Úrvalsdeild kvenna (basketball)
European basketball awards
Basketball most valuable player awards